Lizalde may refer to:

Eduardo Lizalde (born 1929), Mexican poet, academic and administrator
Enrique Lizalde (1937–2013), Mexican film, television and theater actor 
Guillermo Márquez Lizalde (born 1961), Mexican politician 
José Luis Medina Lizalde (born 1951), Mexican politician